Living Loud is the self-titled debut album by the hard rock project Living Loud, formed by bass guitarist Bob Daisley and drummer Lee Kerslake in 2003. Both men had previously recorded with Ozzy Osbourne, writing and recording on the Blizzard of Ozz and Diary of a Madman albums. Australian rock singer Jimmy Barnes and Deep Purple guitarist Steve Morse were also part of the project. Keyboard player Don Airey, who also worked on Osbourne's albums with Kerslake and Daisley, recorded his parts of the album at his home studio in London. Half the songs were originals and half were covers from Osbourne's first two albums, which Kerslake and Daisley had co-written.

Track listing

Personnel
Living Loud
Jimmy Barnes – vocals
Bob Daisley – bass
Steve Morse – guitar
Lee Kerslake – drums
Don Airey – keyboards

Charts

References

2004 debut albums
Living Loud albums